François Franceschi-Losio (3 July 1770 – 1810) was an Italo-French general, who entered the French Revolutionary army in 1795.

Born in Milan, he served through the Italian campaign of 1796–97, and subsequently, like Franceschi-Delonne, with Masséna at Zurich and at Genoa, and at the headquarters of King Joseph Bonaparte in Italy and Spain. He was killed in a duel by Carlo Filangieri in 1810.

References

1770 births
1810 deaths
Military personnel from Milan
Italian people of French descent
French generals
French commanders of the Napoleonic Wars
Italian duellists
Italian military personnel of the Napoleonic Wars